Brick House, also known as Woodlands, is a historic plantation house located at White Plains, Brunswick County, Virginia. It was built about 1831–1833, and began as a two-story, brick I-house.  It was remodeled in 1860, with the addition of the massive hexastyle portico covering the entire front facade. Also on the property is a contributing 19th-century outbuilding connected to the main house by a covered walkway.

It was listed on the National Register of Historic Places in 1982.

References

Plantation houses in Virginia
Houses on the National Register of Historic Places in Virginia
Houses completed in 1860
Houses in Brunswick County, Virginia
National Register of Historic Places in Brunswick County, Virginia